Kobyaysky District (Kebeeyi uluuha) is an administrative and municipal district (raion, or ulus), one of the thirty-four in the Sakha Republic, Russia. It is located in the center of the republic on the Vilyuy River,  by road north of the republic's capital of Yakutsk. Its administrative center is the urban-type settlement of Sangar. As of the 2010 Census, the total population of the district was 13,680, with the population of Sangar accounting for 32.0% of that number.

Geography
Mountainous areas are located in the north and northeast of the district, with the Kuturgin Range, Muosuchan Range, Munni Range and Ust-Vilyuy Range, subranges of the Verkhoyansk Range, while the rest of the district is part of the Central Yakutian Lowland.

Several rivers flow through the district. These include the Lena River, which flows between the mouths of tributaries of the Aldan, the Linde, and its tributary the Vilyuy in the lower reaches, as well as the Kenkeme, Tyugyuene, Sitte, Tympylykan, Khanchaly, Belyanka, the Tumara and the Nuora. The largest of the district's lowland lakes is Nedzheli. A part of the Ust-Vilyuysky National Park is also located on the district's territory.

Climate

History
The territory of what is now Kobyaysky District has long been settled by the Even, Evenk, and Yakut peoples. Silver-lead deposits were found in Yendybalskoye as early as 1765. In 1913, the coal potential of the area was noted and coal mining began at Tsugaru in the late 1920s. The first elementary school opened in Kobyay in 1926. In 1928, as the coal mining operations got underway, the miners established the new village of Sangar. In 1931, the first collective farms began to appear, and the first medical dispensary in the area was opened at Tsugaru mine, with the first pharmacy opening a year later. In 1936, a fishing organization was established in the area to unite the small fishing enterprises that had begun to develop.

Kobyaysky District was formed on April 20, 1937 from the remote territories of Namsky, Gorny, and Vilyuysky Districts, with the district's administrative center located in Kobyay. In 1959, however, the administrative center was moved to Sangar. In 1938, thermal power stations operating on coal were built in Sangar, and the first library opened in Kobyay. By 1939, the two main villages were connected by radio and in 1946 with a telephone station. In September 1942, 2,482 were recorded as moving into the district. In 1944, the district newspaper Sana oloh (renamed Leninets in 1962 and Dabaan in 1993) was established, and in 1945 an airport was commissioned,  from Sangar. The first savings bank opened in 1946 and on April 16, 1947, Sangar commissioned a new steam turbine power plant.

In 1952, the oil and gas reserves of the area began to be exploited, and over the next few years there was extensive planning and drilling to find these reserves. In 1957, mass carp fishing began on Lake Nidzhili. In 1963, the construction of a  gas pipeline Taas–Tumus–Berge–Yakutsk–Mokhsogollokh began—the first in the world on permafrost and in a sub-polar climate. Several schools were established in the district in the 1960s and 1970s, with the folk theater opened in 1973 and Kobyay children's music school in 1974. The oil and gas industry developed extensively during the 1980s and 1990s.

On February 1, 2006, at a frequency of 102 FM, radio NEC "Sakha" started broadcasting.

Administrative and municipal status
Within the framework of administrative divisions, Kobyaysky District is one of the thirty-four in the republic. It is divided into one settlement (an administrative division with the administrative center in the urban-type settlement (inhabited locality) of Sangar) and eleven rural okrugs (naslegs), all of which comprise twenty-two rural localities. As a municipal division, the district is incorporated as Kobyaysky Municipal District. The Settlement of Sangar is incorporated into an urban settlement, and the eleven rural okrugs are incorporated into eleven rural settlements within the municipal district. The urban-type settlement of Sangar serves as the administrative center of both the administrative and municipal district.

Inhabited localities

Economy
The leading industry is agriculture, with cattle, pig, horse breeding, reindeer husbandry, poultry farming, cellular farming, fisheries, mining, and furs forming much of the main economic activity in the district. The district has notable deposits of gold, silver, lead, zinc, gas, coal, and building materials. In 1998, upon the decision of the Russian Ministry of Energy, the Tsugaru coal mine was closed. In 2000, a fire broke out. In 2008, the Mastakhskoye gas-condensate field was in the final stages of development.

The district has a number of facilities such as printing houses, clubs, a theater in Kobyay, and vocational, educational, sports, and children's art schools.

The Sangar Airport is the main airport in the district.

Demographics

As of the 2002 Census, the ethnic composition of the district is as follows:
Yakuts: 9,209 people (65.0%)
Russians: 3,425 people (24.2%)
Evens: 809 people (5.7%)
Ukrainians: 235 people (1.7%)
Evenks: 64 people (0.4%)
other ethnicities: 436 people (3.1%)

References

Notes

Sources
Official website of the Sakha Republic. Registry of the Administrative-Territorial Divisions of the Sakha Republic. Kobyaysky District. 

Districts of the Sakha Republic
States and territories established in 1937
Central Yakutian Lowland